The Sudanese Peace Agreement, also known as the Juba Agreement for Peace in Sudan, or simply the Juba Agreement, is a historic peace agreement, signed on August 31, 2020, in Juba, South Sudan, by the Sudanese government, headed by Abdallah Hamdok and in the presence of the head of the Sudanese Sovereignty Council, Abdel Fattah al-Burhan, with the Sudanese Revolutionary Front, which includes the five main Sudanese rebel groups, and at the head the Justice and Equality Movement and the Sudan Liberation Movement, both from the Darfur region in the west, and the Sudan People's Liberation Movement-North, which is leading a rebellion against the Sudanese government in South Kordofan and Blue Nile.

The agreement aims to achieve stability and peace in Sudan after decades of multiple civil conflicts, which have killed more than 300,000 people and displaced more than 2.5 million, according to estimates, especially after the conflict in Darfur has expanded since 2003.

Agreement protocols
The agreement includes eight protocols, including:
Reorganizing and reconfiguring the security forces and the army, whereby, according to the agreement, members of the armed movements will be integrated into the government forces upon the dissolution of the Front's militias.
The application of transitional justice in all of Sudan.
Compensation and reparation.
Development of the nomadic and herders sector.
Redistribution of wealth and economic rights.
Solve the issue of the displaced and refugees.
Land redistribution, including solving the hawakeer problem, which is a name given to lands that fall within the control of tribes or property that call for it.
The power-sharing protocol comes on top of these protocols, as it was agreed that the rebel parties would have political representation within the Sudanese Sovereignty Council within the transitional phase in Sudan.

Final signature
On Saturday 3 October 2020, Juba, the capital of South Sudan, witnessed the signing of the peace agreement between the Sudanese government and a number of armed movements, to resolve decades of conflicts in Darfur, South Kordofan and Southern Blue Nile that led to the displacement of millions and the deaths of hundreds of thousands, with the participation of many sponsors, most notably the UAE .

The signing ceremony at Freedom Square in Juba was attended by the presidents of Chad, Djibouti and Somalia, along with the prime ministers of Egypt and Ethiopia, the Emirati Minister of Energy, the US Special Envoy for Sudan and South Sudan and representatives of a number of Western countries. Among the armed groups that signed the Juba Agreement, the Sudan Liberation Army Movement, The Arko Minawi wing, the Justice and Equality Movement, and the popular movement, Malik Aqar's wing, along with other factions.

UN support for Sudan
Last June, the UN Security Council adopted two resolutions on Sudan, which established the UN mission under the name (UNTAMS), whose mission is to provide support to the transitional government in building and implementing peace agreements and protecting civilians in Darfur, South Kordofan and Blue Nile.

References

Agreement 
2010s in Sudan
Peace process
2020s in Sudan